Sebastien "Seppe" Smits (born 13 July 1991) is a Belgian professional snowboarder and World Championship medalist.

Smits was born in Westmalle and started snowboarding at a serious level in the winter of 2006–2007, competing in the Europa Cup. He obtained his first World Cup medal when finishing third in the Big Air competition in Stockholm on 22 November 2008, winning the silver medal at the World Championships a few months later in Gangwon. Further medals in the World Cup, both in Big Air and Slopestyle, followed over the next years.

In 2009, Seppe Smits won the rookie Big Air competition at the Air & Style festival in Innsbruck.

Smits finished second in the 6-star TTR event in Beijing on 4 December 2010.

On 8 January 2011, Smits took over the lead in the Swatch TTR World Tour for 2011, after finishing fourth in Davos. One week later, at the 2011 world championships in Barcelona, Smits won a gold medal in the slopestyle competition and finished third in the Big Air after losing the tie-breaker for silver from Zach Stone. Smits ended third in the final results of the 2010–2011 Swatch TTR World Tour, after three-times winner Peetu Piiroinen and Yuri Podladchikov.

He won the 2011–2012 TTR World Tour Big Air title and finished third at the 2012 World Championships in Oslo in the slopestyle event.

He rides goofy.

References

External links
 
 

1991 births
Living people
Belgian male snowboarders
Olympic snowboarders of Belgium
People from Malle
Snowboarders at the 2014 Winter Olympics
Snowboarders at the 2018 Winter Olympics
X Games athletes
Sportspeople from Antwerp Province